Russellville City Schools is a school district in Russellville, Franklin County, Alabama. The school mascot is the Golden Tigers.

Schools
 Russellville High School
 Russellville Middle School
 Russellville Elementary School
 West Elementary School

External links
 

Education in Franklin County, Alabama